Andrew John Rogers  (born 30 April 1933) is an Australian corporate and legal advisor, who was a Judge of the Supreme Court of New South Wales from 1979 to 1993.

Rogers was educated at the Schweizerische Alpine Mittelschule in Davos, Switzerland, and Cranbrook School, Sydney. He graduated from Sydney Law School at the University of Sydney with a Bachelor of Laws (LLB), and was admitted to the bar in New South Wales in 1956. In 1973, he was made Queen's Counsel. In 1979, he was appointed as a Judge of the Supreme Court, and from 1987 to 1992 was the chief judge of the court's commercial division.

In the 1980s, Rogers took the unusual step of enforcing how barristers ran commercial cause cases in the Supreme Court. Fellow Supreme Court judge George Palmer, a commercial barrister at the time, recalled the changes as "shocking", "utterly brutal", and the most dramatic change to court procedure in 150 years.

Since his retirement from the bench in 1993, he has worked as a legal consultant for the Australian Securities and Investments Commission (ASIC) and the law firm Clayton Utz.

Rogers is married to the former Australian Senator Helen Coonan.

References

1933 births
Living people
Judges of the Supreme Court of New South Wales
Officers of the Order of Australia
Australian King's Counsel
Australian barristers
People educated at Cranbrook School, Sydney
Sydney Law School alumni